Claes Gösta Ryn (born 12 June 1943) is an American academic and educator.

Background

Ryn was born and raised in Norrköping in Sweden. He attended the Latin Gymnasium, Norrköpings Högre Allmänna Läroverk' (1959–63). He did military service in the Royal Life Company at the I 4 Regiment in Linkoping and the Signal Corps at the S 1 Regiment in Uppsala. He was an undergraduate and a doctoral student at Uppsala University. He did further doctoral study at Louisiana State University, Baton Rouge, United States, (Ph.D. 1974).

Career
He is a former professor of politics at Catholic University of America (CUA), where he was also chairman of his department for six years.  He taught also at the University of Virginia and Georgetown University. He was co-founder and chairperson of the National Humanities Institute and editor of its academic journal Humanitas. He was co-founder and the first president of the Academy of Philosophy and Letters. He is a past president of the Philadelphia Society (2001 to 2002). He is the founder and former director of the Center for the Study of Statesmanship at CUA.

Political philosopher 

Ryn's fields of teaching and research include ethics and politics; epistemology; historicism; politics and culture; the history of Western political thought; conservatism; the theory of constitutionalism and democracy; Jean-Jacques Rousseau; Irving Babbitt; Benedetto Croce.

He has written much on ethics and politics and on the central role of culture, specifically, the imagination, in shaping politics and society. He has sought to reconstitute the epistemology of the humanities and social sciences, paying close attention to the interaction of will, imagination and reason. He has criticized abstract, ahistorical conceptions of rationality as inadequate to the study of distinctively human life and to the study of real universality. He has argued that there is a much different, experientially grounded form of rationality, the reason of philosophy proper, that is capable of at once humble and penetrating observation. He has developed a philosophy known as value-centered historicism, which demonstrates the potential union of universality and historical particularity. In political theory he has been a sharp critic of Straussian anti-historical thinking and neoconservatism. He has argued that in essential ways neoconservatism resembles the ideology of the  French Jacobins and is neo-Jacobin.

Ryn's discussion of democracy emphasizes that popular government can assume radically different forms, only some of which are compatible with a higher, ethical striving. Theories of what he calls plebiscitary democracy assume romantic and utopian notions of human nature and society. Constitutional democracy is based on a more realistic view of man and is more consonant with the actual moral terms of human existence. This form of government has demanding moral and cultural preconditions and is endangered wherever those preconditions are not satisfied.

Ryn has developed a philosophy of civilization and international relations that emphasizes the moral and cultural preconditions of good relations among persons, peoples, and civilizations. He argues that diversity need not be a source of strife but can even foster mutually enriching interactions, provided that persons, peoples, and civilizations let their distinctiveness be informed by sensitivity to what is highest in each. The way to avoid conflict is not for persons and societies to shed all traits that make them different from others and adopt a homogenous uni-culture, but for each to cultivate the best that it has to offer. In this manner universality and particularity can not merely co-exist, but enter into an enriching dynamic. They can, each in their own way, contribute to an evolving common human ground in which universality and particularity are brought together.

Influence in China 

In 2000 he gave the Distinguished Foreign Scholar Lectures at Beijing University, which also published this lecture series in Chinese translation as a book, Unity Through Diversity (2001). He has lectured and published widely in China. In 2007 he gave a keynote address at the Chinese Academy of Social Science in Beijing. The Chinese edition (2007) of his book America the Virtuous became one of the most hotly discussed in China. Dushu, “probably China’s leading intellectual journal of the past decade”, described it as "the kind of classical work that will be read over the generations." Three of his books and many of his articles have appeared in Chinese translation in China.

In 2012 Beijing Normal University named Ryn Honorary Professor.

Students
Notable students he has mentored include:

 Joshua Bowman, Heidelberg University
 W. Wesley McDonald, Elizabethtown College, author of the definitive intellectual study of Russell Kirk, Russell Kirk and the Age of Ideology
 Edward Hudgins, who has worked in think tanks including the Heritage Foundation, the Cato Institute, and The Atlas Society.

Selected bibliography
The following is a partial list of Dr. Ryn's published works:

America the Virtuous: The Crisis of Democracy and the Quest for Empire (2003)
The New Jacobinism (1991; exp.ed. 2011)
Democracy and the Ethical Life: A Philosophy of Politics and Community (1978, exp. ed. 1990)
Will, Imagination and Reason: Babbitt, Croce and the Problem of Reality (1987, exp. ed. 1997)
A Common Human Ground: Universality and Particularity in a Multicultural World (2003, exp. ed. 2019)

References

External links
 Humanitas official site
 National Humanities Institute official site

1943 births
American political scientists
Georgetown University faculty
Living people
People from Norrköping
Swedish emigrants to the United States
Swedish political scientists
Critics of neoconservatism
Catholic University of America School of Arts and Sciences faculty
University of Virginia faculty
Uppsala University alumni
Louisiana State University alumni